Times Square is a high-rise building in District 1, Ho Chi Minh City, Vietnam. This tower is a 40-storey joint tower and features a modern architectural style. Construction costs, invested by Times Square (Vietnam) Investment Joint Stock Company, totals approximately US$125 million. The height to the top of the tower is 164 m (538 ft). The tower was once the third tallest building in Ho Chi Minh City after Saigon One Tower and Bitexco Financial Tower. Currently, Saigon Times Square ranks sixth in height in the city and 23rd nationally.

Times Square hosts The Reverie Saigon, a 286-room Leading Hotels of the World-affiliated luxury hotel, along with 89 service apartments and 11,900 sq meters of office space.

Gallery

See also
List of tallest buildings in Vietnam

References 

Skyscrapers in Ho Chi Minh City
Skyscraper office buildings in Vietnam
Residential skyscrapers